Information Commission includes 1 Chief Information Commissioner (CIC) and not more than 10 Information Commissioners (IC) who are appointed by the President of India.

References

Indian government officials